Leonid Denysenko is a Ukrainian Australian artist living in Sydney, Australia. He is notable for the introduction of the graphic art technique of "literography". He is the only surviving founding member of the Ukrainian Artists Society of Australia.

Biography and career 

Born in Warsaw in 1926 of Ukrainian émigré parents, Leonid studied art in Poland. After World War II he worked as an artist with the United States armed forces in Germany.

After arriving in Australia in 1949 with his family, he was sent to a migrant reception and training camp at Bathurst, NSW. As part of the 'assisted passage' Leonid and his brother, Yurij were under a contract to the Australian Government to work where the Government sent them, and the two young men learnt they were to be sent to Queensland as sugar cane cutters. As related by Leonid himself in a 2-page article in the Australian Women's Weekly:

In time, the Denysenkos left the camp and Leonid with his mother and brother Yurij, helped stage a number of Ukrainian arts and craft shows in Australia. By 1950 Leonid Denysenko was already being featured in Australian media as a "migrant artist from Ukraine", and "a young Ukrainian whose pen-and- ink work is much above the ordinary".

Leonid completed the necessary examinations which allowed him to teach art in secondary and high schools and his varied career saw him work as a stage and set designer for the theatre and films, a cartoonist and illustrator of books and periodicals, a stamp designer, a leading dancer in a ballet company, an art teacher and principal and a freelance journalist.

He holds a Degree in Graphic Art, a Certificate in Education and a Diploma in Fine Arts.

Commonwealth Jubilee Exhibition of New Australian Arts and Crafts 

In 1951 Leonid Denysenko was chosen to be in charge of the New Australian Arts and Crafts Exhibition, which was part of the celebrations for the Jubilee of Australia's Federation. Denysenko's pen-and-ink sketches of Australian towns visited during the exhibition's tour were also part of the show. This touring exhibition visited capital cities and towns in all the states of Australia, including Queensland and Tasmania.

Works 

Leonid Denysenko pioneered a new graphic art technique called "literography", which uses letters from words to form detailed pictures. His most famous work is the icon "God is Love", which features an image of Jesus Christ using letters of the word Love written in 79 different languages.

In December 1955, the Australian Department of Immigration announced a public competition to obtain designs for a suitable stamp about migration. Designs also were sought from a further 10 artists and designers including from Leonid Denysenko. About 300 entries were received.

Despite the great response to the competition and much discussion, a stamp on the theme of migration was never issued. Instead, the Department of Immigration used many of the entries in its touring immigration and citizenship promotional displays. In 1989 the two entries by Denysenko were featured in an exhibition of these "forgotten works" at the Powerhouse Museum in Sydney.

Together with his brother Jurij, an architect, Leonid won a competition for the design of the International Monument in Fairfield in Western Sydney, that celebrates migration and the multi-ethnic community in that local government area.

Denysenko's designed the mosaics adorning the church at the Ukrainian Orthodox Centre in Canberra.

Exhibitions 

Leonid Denysenko has exhibited in group exhibitions of the Ukrainian Artists Society of Australia in both Australia, and Ukraine, and his work "God is Love" has featured in many exhibitions throughout Australia.

Group exhibitions 

 1973 – International Eucharistic Congress – Arts Festival, Exhibition Building, Melbourne, 15–25 February 1973
 2001 — "Devotion: the Religious, the Domestic and the Pacific", Casula Powerhouse Arts Centre, 12 September – 18 October 2001
 2010 — "Text as Spiritual Imagery" Exhibition, McGlade Gallery, Strathfield, September – October 2010

Notes and references

External links 
 Pen and ink graphic by Leonid Denysenko "Poor neighborhood of the city of Ipswich, Queensland, Australia", 1951 in Ukrainian Art Digest, No. 18, December 1978, с. 75

 

Australian people of Ukrainian descent
Australian cartoonists
Mosaic artists
Postcard artists
Religious artists
Christian artists
Polish emigrants to Australia
Living people
1926 births
Polish expatriates in Germany